William or Will or Willie Harris may refer to:

Politicians and political activists
William Harris (born 1504) (1504–?), MP for Newport, Cornwall
William Harris (died 1556), MP for Maldon
William Harris (MP, died 1709) (c. 1652–1709), English landowner and member of parliament for St Ives, and for Okehampton 
William Harris (Birmingham Liberal) (1826–1911), Liberal Party politician and strategist, architect, and writer, in Birmingham, England
William Harris (civil rights leader) (1867–1931), Australian advocate for Aboriginal rights
William Harris (Symbionese Liberation Army), 20th century American militant
William Alexander Harris (Kansas politician) (1841–1909), U.S. Representative from Kansas
William Alexander Harris (Virginia politician) (1805–1864), U.S. Representative from Virginia
William C. Harris (Illinois politician) (1921–2004), American politician
William J. Harris (1868–1932), U.S. Senator from Georgia
William Littleton Harris (1807–1868), Justice of the Mississippi Court of Errors and Appeals
William L. Harris (1923–2013), American politician
William James Harris (1835–1911), Conservative Party politician
William R. Harris (1803–1858), justice of the Tennessee Supreme Court
William Harris (New York politician), American businessman and politician from New York

Sportsmen
William Harris (American football) (1965–2014), American football tight end
Will Harris (American football), American football safety
Bill Harris (swimmer) (1897–1961), American swimmer and Olympic bronze medallist
William Harris (tennis) (1947–2002), American tennis player
William Harris (cricketer, born 1861) (1861–1923), English cricketer
William Harris (cricketer, born 1864) (1864–1949), English cricketer
William Harris (cricketer, born 1883) (1883–1967), English cricketer
William Harris (footballer) (1890–?), Scottish footballer
William Harris (rugby union) (1876–1950), New Zealand rugby union player
Will Harris (baseball) (born 1984), baseball player
Willie Harris (born 1978), baseball player
Will Harris (rugby union) (born 2000), Australian rugby union player
Will Harris (footballer) (born 2000), English footballer

Academics and religious figures
William Harris (Presbyterian minister) (1675?–1740), English divine
William Harris (historian) (1720–1770), English dissenting minister and historian
William Harris (academic) (1765–1829), president of Columbia University
William C. Harris (historian), professor of history at North Carolina State University
William Logan Harris (1817–1887), Bishop of the Methodist Episcopal Church
William Henry Harris (academic) (1884–1956), Welsh divine, canon and treasurer of St David's Cathedral, and professor of Welsh at St David's College, Lampeter
William Stewart Harris (1922–1994), English-born Australian anthropologist, journalist and Aboriginal rights advocate
William V. Harris (born 1938), professor of history
William Wadé Harris (c. 1860–1929), African evangelist
William S. Harris, American professor and researcher on human nutrition

Soldiers
William Harris (colonist) (1757–1812), figure in the American Revolution
William Harris, 2nd Baron Harris (1782–1845), British soldier and peer
William Harris, American Civil War colonel, son of Ira Harris
William W. Harris (Medal of Honor) (1850–1878), Medal of Honor recipient for action in the Indian Wars
William Frederick Harris (1918–1950), United States Marine Corps officer

Engineers, inventors and scientists
William Cornwallis Harris (1807–1848), English military engineer, artist and hunter
Sir William Gordon Harris (1912–2005), British civil engineer
William Snow Harris (1791–1867), invented a ship-borne lightning rod
William Harris, former director general of Science Foundation Ireland

Others
William Harris (beachcomber) (c. 1813–1889), British escaped convict and settler in pre-colonial Nauru
William Harris (musician) (fl. 1927–1928), American country blues guitarist, singer, and songwriter
William Harris (theatrical producer) (1844–1916), American theatre producer and vaudevillian performer
William Harris (Tudor person) (1556–1616), English knight, landowner and incorporator in the third Virginia Company of London
William Harris (settler) (1610–1681), founding settler of Providence, Rhode Island
William Harris, 6th Earl of Malmesbury (1907–2000), British peer
Bill Harris (neuroscientist) (born 1950), Canadian-born neuroscientist
William Critchlow Harris (1854–1913), Canadian architect
William C. Harris (police officer), Assistant Commissioner of the Metropolitan Police, 1856–1881
Sir William Henry Harris (1883–1973), English organist and composer
William H. Harris (orthopaedic surgeon) (born 1927), American orthopaedic surgeon
William Laurel Harris (1870–1924), American muralist and editor
William Torrey Harris (1835–1909), United States Commissioner of Education, American educator, philosopher, lexicographer
William Harris Jr. (1884–1946), Broadway theatrical producer
William Harris, founder of the Ottawa Citizen newspaper
 William Bevan Harris, British-American comic actor, better known as Billy Bevan

See also
Bill Harris (disambiguation)
William Harries (disambiguation)
William Hamlyn-Harris (born 1978), Australian javelin thrower